Barry Lynn Winmill (born March 18, 1952) is a Senior United States district judge of the United States District Court for the District of Idaho.

Early life and education
Winmill was born in Blackfoot, Idaho, and grew up on a dairy farm. Winmill received a Bachelor of Arts degree from Idaho State University (ISU) in Pocatello in 1974. Winmill served as student body president while at ISU. Winmill earned his Juris Doctor from Harvard Law School in 1977.

Career
Winmill was in private practice in Denver, Colorado from 1977 to 1979, and in Pocatello, Idaho from 1979 to 1987.

He was a state judge in the Idaho District Court (Sixth District) in Pocatello from 1987 to 1995, having been appointed by Governor Cecil Andrus. From 1992 to 1995, he served as the administrative district judge for the Sixth District and chair of the state's Evidence Rules Committee. Winmill concurrently an adjunct professor at ISU (1991–1995). A finalist on three occasions for the Idaho Supreme Court, he was never nominated.

Federal judicial service
On May 24, 1995, Winmill was nominated by President Bill Clinton to a seat on the U.S. District Court for the District of Idaho, vacated by Harold Ryan for senior status in early 1993. The American Bar Association's Standing Committee on the Federal Judiciary, which rates judicial nominees, unanimously rated Winmill as "well qualified" for the post (the committee's highest rating).

Winmill was confirmed by the Senate on August 11, 1995, by voice vote. He received his commission three days later.

Winmill served as chief judge of the U.S. District Court for the District of Idaho for 19 years, from 1999 to January 1, 2019.

Noteworthy cases
Winmill granted the habeas corpus petition of Charles Fain, a wrongfully convicted man who spent 18 years on Idaho's death row. Winmill ordered DNA testing that was previously unavailable; the new testing exonerated Fain, who was released from prison. Winmill and Fain later made joint speaking appearances.

In 1999, Winmill presided over the trial of Allan Elias, a southeastern Idaho businessman, on charges of arising from 1996 incident in which Elias ordered an employee, who lacked safety training or proper protective equipment, to clean the inside of a large tank that stored a toxic mixture of phosphoric acid and cyanide. The employee suffered severe brain damage. and Elias was convicted of "knowingly endangering the safety and health of his employees, illegally disposing of hazardous cyanide waste and making a false statement to the Occupational Safety and Health Administration." In 2000, Winmill sentenced Elias to 17 years in prison, the longest-ever sentence in the United States for an environmental crime.

In Western Watersheds Project v. Fish and Wildlife Service (2007), Winmill ordered the United States Fish and Wildlife Service (FWS) to reconsider its decision not to list the sage-grouse as an endangered or threatened species under the Endangered Species Act. In an opinion highly critical of FWS officials, Winmill singled out deputy assistant secretary Julie A. MacDonald for criticism, and held that the agency had impermissibly disregarded scientific evidence in making its decision to deny protection to the sage-grouse.

In Animal Legal Defense Fund v. Otter (2015), Winmill struck down the "ag gag" law passed by the Idaho Legislature in 2012, ruling that the statute—which, among other things, banned the audio or visual recording of agricultural operations—violated the Free Speech Clause of the First Amendment to the United States Constitution. In January 2018, the U.S. Court of Appeals for the Ninth Circuit upheld most of the ruling.

In Edmo v. Idaho Department of Correction (2018), Winmill ruled in favor of a transgender inmate diagnosed with gender dysphoria, who challenged the state's refusal to provide gender confirmation surgery. Winmill ruled that the state's disregard of the "generally accepted medical standards for the treatment of gender dysphoria" constituted deliberate indifference to the inmate's medical needs, in violation of the Eighth Amendment to the United States Constitution.

Personal life
Winmill is married; he and his wife Judy have four children and fourteen grandchildren.
 
He has served as a member of the board of the Idaho Humanities Council; as a member of the Board of Visitors of Brigham Young University's J. Reuben Clark Law School; and as a co-founder of the Idaho Legal History Society, which sponsored the performance of an original play marking the hundredth anniversary of the high-profile trial of Big Bill Haywood.

Notes

References

External links

|-

1952 births
20th-century American judges
21st-century American judges
Harvard Law School alumni
Idaho Democrats
Idaho lawyers
Idaho state court judges
Idaho State University alumni
Idaho State University faculty
Judges of the United States District Court for the District of Idaho
Living people
People from Blackfoot, Idaho
United States district court judges appointed by Bill Clinton